Kazakhstan is divided into 17 regions (/oblystar; singular: облыс/oblys; /oblasti; singular: область/oblast). The regions are further subdivided into districts (/audandar; singular: аудан/audan; /; singular: /). Three cities, Shymkent, the largest city Almaty, and the capital Astana) are not part of the regions they are surrounded by.

On 16 March 2022, Kazakh President Kassym-Jomart Tokayev announced that three new regions would be created. Abai Region was created from East Kazakhstan Region with its capital in Semey. Ulytau Region was created from Karaganda Region with its capital in Jezkazgan. Jetisu Region was created from Almaty Region with its capital in Taldykorgan; Almaty Region's capital was moved from Taldykorgan to Qonayev.



 Regions 

 Demographic statistics 
In 2022, three new regions were created - Abai (from part of East Kazakhstan), Jetisu (from part of Almaty Region} and Ulytau' (from part of Karaganda Region). In the following table, the 2009 population totals have been amended to reflect the population in the new or altered regions.

Former administrative boundaries 

Over the last 60 years, both the distribution and names of regions of Kazakhstan have changed considerably. Major changes were several fusions and splits between Guryev and Mangystau, Karaganda and Dzhezkazgan, Almaty and Taldy-Kurgan, East Kazakhstan and Semipalatinsk and Kostanay, Turgay and Tselinograd, respectively. Changes in region names were often in line with the renaming of cities, such as in the case of Alma-Ata/Almaty. After the administrative reform in 1997, the last change happened since then took place in 1999, when parts of North Kazakhstan that originally belonged to Kokshetau region became part of Akmola. The 1990s merges were in order to dilute the Russian population in the resulting region and to avoid having regions where Russians form a majority.

Notes 
Notes
 Almaty, Astana and Shymkent cities have the status of State significance and do not relate to any region.
 The West Kazakhstan and Atyrau regions are both partly located in Eastern Europe as the Ural River runs through Atyrau and Oral, their respective capital cities.
 Baikonur city has a special status because it is currently being leased to Russia with Baikonur Cosmodrome until the year 2050.

References

Sources 
 GeoHive

 
Subdivisions of Kazakhstan
Kazakhstan, Regions
Kazakhstan 1
Kazakhstan 1
Regions, Kazakhstan
Kazakhstan geography-related lists